The  (sometimes referred as ) is a semi-desert natural region, or badlands, of some  in southeast Navarre (Spain). The soils are made up of clay, chalk and sandstone and have been eroded by water and wind creating surprising shapes, canyons, plateaus, tabular structures and isolated hills, called cabezos. Bardenas Reales lacks urban areas, vegetation is scarce and the many streams that cross the territory have a markedly seasonal flow, staying dry most of the year.

Location
The Bardenas is in the southeast of Navarre, bordering Aragon. It is located in the middle of the depression of the Ebro valley at the foot of the mountains of the Yugo and the Zaragoza region of Cinco Villas. There are only sixteen municipalities, of which thirteen are in Navarre and three in the province of Zaragoza. The Navarrese are Valtierra, Arguedas, Carcastillo, Santacara, Mélida, Rada, Caparroso, Villafranca, Cadreita, Tudela, Cabanillas, Fustiñana and Buñuel, while the Zaragozan are: Tauste, Ejea de los Caballeros and Sádaba.

Las Bardenas are divided into several distinct areas which mainly include two, Black Bardena and White Bardena, but there are other smaller areas of great singularity.

White Bardena
It is the central area and more desert. Its relief is characterized by extensive plains and deep gorges through which rivers flow. This Bardena owes its name to the presence of white salt that extend over the surface due to the abundance of gypsum in the soil.

The White Bardena divides into two, the White Lower and Upper White. The first is the most depressed and the second extending from Pisquerra and Eguaras to Carcastillo.

Black Bardena
Black Bardena is situated in the south-eastern part of the territory on the border of the Autonomous Community of Aragon. Formed by plateaus of different altitudes and cut by rivers flowing at the bottom of the cliffs, this part of the Bardenas is covered with vegetation.

Central Plateau
It is formed by Tertiary and Quaternary soils that were raised by pressure associated with the creation of the Pyrenees and the mountains of Central Spain that caused the collapse of the Ebro basin forming an inland sea enclosed by the Catalan Coastal Range. Sediments laid down were then eroded from the Eocene onwards. These formed gravel and sandstone that stayed at the top, fine sand, clay and limestone occupy the lower slopes. Clay remained in the centre and limestone and gypsum formed at the edges. The gravels, sandstones and clay were all associated with alluvial deposits. Mixtures of sandstone and clay formed two mountain ranges in between the centre and perimeter. Ten million years ago, the basin opened to the Mediterranean Sea and drained, leaving the Ebro, which began water erosion along the southern perimeter, which left the remaining land relatively flat. The folding effect of erosion is caused by the alternate soft and hard materials. If the layers are horizons, then the Cabezas became isolated.

References
 Bardenas Reales desert (french)

External links 

 The landscape of Bardenas Reales
 Las Bardenas Reales 

Deserts of Spain
Deserts of Europe
Biosphere reserves of Spain
Natural parks of Spain
Natural regions of Spain
Protected areas established in 1999
Protected areas of Navarre
1999 establishments in Spain